Sorry for the Delay is the name of several music albums:

 Sorry for the Delay (Grizzly Bear album), 2006
 Sorry for the Delay (340ml album), 2009
 Sorry for the Delay (Just a Band album), 2012